Thousand Oaks may refer to:

 Thousand Oaks, California, Ventura County
 Thousand Oaks, Berkeley, California
 Thousand Oaks Boulevard
 Thousand Oaks, Crawford County, Missouri 
 Thousand Oaks, Chesterfield, Missouri 
 Thousand Oaks, Parkville, Missouri

See also 
 Thousand Oaks Freeway
 Thousand Oaks High School
 Thousand Oaks Library
 Thousand Oaks Civic Arts Plaza
 Thousand Oaks Community Gallery
 Thousand Oaks shooting, 8 November 2018
 Thousand Oaks Transit
 List of films shot in Thousand Oaks
 Norwegian Colony (Thousand Oaks)
 Oxnard–Thousand Oaks–Ventura metropolitan area
 The Oaks (Thousand Oaks, California) 
 7000 Oaks